This is a list of rivers of Kazakhstan, arranged by drainage basin. Tributaries are listed in order from mouth to source.

Flowing into the Arctic Ocean

Ob

Irtysh (Ertis) River
Tobol
Ubagan
Ayat
Uy
Syntasty
Ishim
Imanburlyq
Aqqanburlyq
Terisaqqan
Qalqutan
Shagan
Ashchysu
Uba
Ulba
Bukhtarma
Lukina
Naryn
Kürshim

Flowing into endorheic basins

Caspian Depression
Volga River
Akhtuba (distributary)
Kigach (distributary)
Ural River
Shagan
Utva (Shynghyrlau)
Ilek
Kargaly
Or
Bolshoy Uzen (Ülken Özen)
Maly Uzen (Kishi Özen)
Emba
Aschiagar River
Saghyz
Uil

Aral Sea

Syr Darya
Sarysu
Chu (Shu)
Talas
Asa
Ak-Suu
Kichi-Kemin
Bögen
Arys
Badam
Sayramsu
Mashat
Boralday
Keles

Akkol
Uly-Zhylanshyk

Shalkarteniz
Turgay
Irgiz
Ulkayak
Tegene
Zhyngyldyozek
Kalmakkyrgan
Baikonyr
Zhymyky

Lake Tengiz
Nura
Sherubainura

Balkhash-Alakol Basin
Ili
Charyn
Chilik
Esentai
Karatal
Koksu
Büyen
Qapal
Lepsy
Aksu (Lake Balkhash)
Ayagöz
Issyk
Tokrau
Bakanas

Lake Alakol
Emil
Urzhar

Lake Shaganak
Shiderti

Lake Siletiteniz
Sileti

Bolshoy Azhbulat
Burla

Lake Zhalanashkol
Terekty

Kazakhstan
Rivers